The Hispano-Suiza Carmen is an electric sports car produced by Hispano-Suiza.

History
Hispano-Suiza Cars successfully constructed and put into production the first Spanish car since the 1930s to bear this brand. The Carmen premiered at the 2019 Geneva Motor Show in the form of a two-door coupe. The car was built on a carbon frame covered with an aluminum body. As a hypercar, Hispano-Suiza built this car a response to other super-fast electric cars from companies such as Lotus and Rimac.

The stylistic design of the car was the responsibility of the Barcelona-based design studio Cero Design, giving it an aesthetic combining avant-garde, futuristic stylistic solutions with retro aesthetics referred directly to the Hispano-Suiza H6B Dubonnet Xenia. It was clearly shown, among others, by covered wheel arches above the rear wheels, as well as a pointed and pointed rear decorated with embossing and logos referring to historical Hispano-Suiza markings. The Carmen is named after Carmen Mateu, the granddaughter of one of the co-founders Hispano-Suiza Damián Mateu. This attempted to restore Hispano-Suiza as an automotive company, and the founders of Hispano-Suiza Cars paid tribute to her.

Carmen Boulogne

In September 2021, Hispano-Suiza introduced a special, limited version of its electric hypercar, the Carmen Boulogne. The car underwent extensive visual modifications, losing the characteristic rear wheel cover, and gaining an unpainted, black carbon fiber body enriched with copper inserts. The car also gained a more powerful drive system, in which two more electric motors were added to the standard two electric motors, thus achieving a total power of 1114 hp and 1600 Nm of maximum torque. The company planned to construct five copies, with deliveries scheduled for 2022. The price of the vehicle is less than € 2 million.

Notes

Carmen
Coupés
Electric sports cars
Rear mid-engine, rear-wheel-drive vehicles
Cars introduced in 2019
2020s cars
Cars of Spain